The Cloverbelt Conference is a high school athletic conference in the U.S. state of Wisconsin. It consists of 17 schools from west central Wisconsin, located between the Eau Claire – Chippewa Falls metropolitan area and the  Marshfield-Wisconsin Rapids Micropolitan Statistical Area. It was formed in 1927-1928 with five members: Boyd High School, Cadott High School, Owen High School, Stanley High School, and Thorp High School.  The conference is a member of the Wisconsin Interscholastic Athletic Association (WIAA).

Members
Altoona High School
Cadott High School
Colby High School
Columbus Catholic High School
Gilman High School
Granton High School
Greenwood High School
Fall Creek High School
Loyal High School
McDonell Central Catholic High School
Neillsville High School
Osseo-Fairchild High School
Owen-Withee High School
Regis High School
Spencer High School
Stanley-Boyd High School
Thorp High School

Former members
Abbotsford High School
Auburndale High School
Augusta High School
Cornell High School
Elk Mound High School
Lake Holcombe High School
Mosinee High School
Nekoosa High School
 Dor-Abby High School (school split "Dor" - Dorchester, Wisconsin consolidated with Colby High School)
 Stanley High School (school consolidated with Boyd High School) 
 Boyd High School (school consolidated with Stanley High School)
 Owen High School (school consolidated with Withee High School)
 Withee High School (school consolidated with Owen High School)

Historical timeline
 1927: Boyd, Cadott, Owen, Stanley, Thorp form conference
 1928: Cornell joins 
 1933: Lake Holcombe, Gilman join 
 1937: Withee joins 
 1939: Cadott, Cornell, Thorp, Withee start 6 man football Cloverbelt Conference
 1944: conference switches to 8 man
 1945: Neillsville joins; Cadott, Cornell, Neillsville, Owen, Stanley, Thorp, Withee belong to the football version.
 1946: Lake Holcombe leaves; Altoona joins; Stanley leaves football conference replaced by Greenwood
 1947: conference starts playing 11 man football
 1948: Boyd leaves; Fall Creek joins; Greenwood drops out of football conference
 1950: Withee drops out of football conference
 1951: Conference starts playing baseball, Stanley rejoins football conference
 1953: Gilman joins football conference
 1955: Owen and Withee consolidate, form Owen Withee, join football as well 
 1956: Elk Mound joins 
 1962: Elk Mound leaves; Colby, Dor-Abby, Loyal, Greenwood join for all sports 
 1964: Dor-Abby dissolves consolidation; Abbotsford joins, Conference splits into East and West for football as Altoona and Fall Creek are added
 1965: Stanley and Boyd consolidate to form Stanley-Boyd; Holcombe joins for all sports
 1966: Abbotsford leaves 
 1970: Lake Holcombe leaves 
 1975: Colby leaves 
 1978: Auburndale, Colby, Mosinee, Nekoosa join 
 1982: Nekoosa leaves 
 1986: Osseo-Fairchild joins 
 1990: Augusta joins 
 1998: Cornell leaves 
 2000: Auburndale leaves; Regis, McDonell join
 2008: Granton, Spencer, Columbus join 
 2008-2009: Mosinee leaves 
 2014: Augusta leaves

Fall sports

Football
In 1939,  Cadott, Cornell, Thorp and Withee start playing 6 man football as the Cloverbelt Conference. In 1964, the Cloverbelt Conference was separated into two divisions, East and West. This was changed to Large and Small Divisions in 1978 when Auburndale, Colby, Mosinee, and Nekoosa joined the conference. At the end of the 2007-08 athletic season, the area underwent a major conference realignment. Some of the schools in the Cloverbelt Conference merged with some of the schools from the Marawood Conference to form the CloverWood Conference (football only). In 2016, McDonell Central opted to go to an 8 man football team that should start play in the 2018 season.

Pre-realignment:
 Large Cloverbelt: Altoona, Cadott, Colby, Fall Creek, Neillsville, Osseo-Fairchild, Stanley-Boyd, Mosinee
 Small Cloverbelt: Augusta, Gilman, Greenwood, Loyal, McDonell, Owen-Withee, Regis, Thorp

Post-realignment:
 Cloverbelt: Colby, Stanley-Boyd, Eau Claire Regis, Altoona, Osseo-Fairchild, Fall Creek, Spencer/Columbus Catholic, Neillsville/Granton, Cadott.
 CloverWood: Abbotsford, Assumption, Athens, Gilman, Greenwood, Loyal, Owen-Withee, Thorp

State champions
 Cadott 1999(D-4); Colby 1998(D-4), 2008(D-5), 2011(D-5); Fall Creek 1993(D-5), 1994(D-5); Greenwood 1990(D-6); Mosinee 1980(D-4), 1981(D-4); Osseo-Fairchild 1996(D-5), 2000(D-5); Owen-Withee 1992(D-6), 1999(D-6), Regis 2003(D-7), 2016 (D-6); Stanley-Boyd 1991(D-5), 1995(D-5), 2013(D-5); Thorp 1993(D-6)

Boys' cross country
Altoona, Cadott, Colby/Abbotsford, Columbus Catholic, Fall Creek, Loyal/Greenwood, McDonell Central, Neillsville/Granton, Osseo-Fairchild, Owen-Withee, Regis, Spencer, Stanley-Boyd, Thorp

State champion
 McDonell Central 2001(D-3)

Girls' cross country
 Girls: Altoona, Cadott, Colby/Abbotsford, Columbus Catholic, Fall Creek, Loyal/Greenwood, McDonell Central, Neillsville/Granton, Osseo-Fairchild, Owen-Withee, Regis, Spencer, Stanley-Boyd, Thorp

State champions
 Fall Creek 1997(D-3)

Volleyball
 East Division: Colby, Columbus Catholic, Gilman, Greenwood, Loyal, Neillsville/Granton, Owen-Withee, Spencer
 West Division: Altoona, Cadott, Fall Creek, McDonell Central, Osseo-Fairchild, Regis, Stanley-Boyd, Thorp

State champions
 Loyal 1979(C), McDonell Central 2009(D-4), Regis 2013(D-3), Stanley-Boyd 2006(D-3)

Winter sports

Basketball
 East Division: Colby, Columbus Catholic, Gilman, Granton, Greenwood, Loyal, Neillsville, Owen-Withee, Spencer
 West Division: Altoona, Cadott, Fall Creek, McDonell Central, Osseo-Fairchild, Regis, Stanley-Boyd, Thorp
State champions-boys
 Altoona 1939(C); Auburndale 1993(D-3), 2000(D-3); Fall Creek 1937(C), 1984(C), 1985(C); Greenwood 1988(C); McDonell Central 2015(D-5); Thorp 2014(D-5)
State champions-girls
 Altoona 2011(D-3); Augusta 1996(D-4); Fall Creek 1985(C), 1987(C), 1988(C), 1996(D-3); Loyal 2017(D-5); Neillsville 2012(D-4); Regis 2011(D-4)

Wrestling
For wrestling, although there are three divisions in the WIAA, some small schools have merged programs to have enough students to compete. The Conference consists of Abbotsford/Colby, Cadott, Neillsville/Greenwood/Loyal, Osseo-Fairchild/Augusta/Fall Creek, Altoona/Regis, Spencer/Columbus Catholic, Stanley-Boyd/Owen-Withee, Thorp

State champions
 Cadott 2001(D-3), 2007(D-3)

Spring sports

Baseball
 East Division: Colby, Columbus Catholic, Gilman, Granton, Greenwood, Loyal, Neillsville, Owen-Withee, Spencer
 West Division: Altoona, Cadott, Fall Creek, McDonell Central, Osseo-Fairchild, Regis, Stanley-Boyd, Thorp
State champions
 Greenwood 1988(C), 1990(C), 2013(D-4)

Golf
 Altoona, Cadott, Colby, Fall Creek, McDonell Central/Regis, Neillsville/Loyal, Osseo-Fairchild, Spencer/Columbus Catholic, Stanley-Boyd, Thorp
State champions
 Mosinee 1995(D-2), Osseo-Fairchild 1994(D-3), 1995(D-3), 1996(D-3), 1999(D-3), 2000(D-3), 2003(D-3), 2004(D-3), 2006(D-3), 2013(D-3)

Softball
 East Division: Colby/Abbotsford, Columbus Catholic, Gilman, Greenwood, Loyal, Neillsville/Granton, Owen-Withee, Spencer
 West Division: Altoona, Cadott, Fall Creek, McDonell Central, Osseo-Fairchild, Regis, Stanley-Boyd, Thorp
State champions
 Altoona 2001 (D-2); Loyal 1978(B), 1979(B), 1980(B); McDonell Central 2008 (D-4), 2017 (D-5); Thorp 2016(D-5)

References

External links
 Cloverbelt Conference

High school sports conferences and leagues in the United States
Wisconsin high school sports conferences